Upogebia is a genus of mud shrimp, in the family Upogebiidae, containing the following species:

Upogebia acanthops Williams, 1986
Upogebia acanthura (Coêlho, 1973)
Upogebia acarinicauda Sakai, 2006
Upogebia aestuari Williams, 1993
Upogebia affinis (Say, 1818)
Upogebia africana (Ortmann, 1894)
Upogebia allobranchus Ngoc-Ho, 1991
Upogebia allspachi Sakai, 2006
Upogebia amboinensis (De Man, 1888)
Upogebia anacanthus Ngoc-Ho, 1994
Upogebia ancylodactyla De Man, 1905
Upogebia annae Thistle, 1973
Upogebia aquilina Williams, 1993
Upogebia aristata Le Loeuff & Intes, 1974
Upogebia assisi Barnard, 1947
Upogebia australiensis De Man, 1927
Upogebia australis Thatje & Gerdes, 2000
Upogebia baldwini Williams, 1997
Upogebia balmaorum Ngoc-Ho, 1990
Upogebia balssi De Man, 1927
Upogebia barbata (Strahl, 1862)
Upogebia baweana Tirmizi & Kazmi, 1979
Upogebia borradailei Sakai, 1982
Upogebia bowerbankii (Miers, 1884)
Upogebia brasiliensis Holthuis, 1956
Upogebia brucei Sakai, 1975
Upogebia burkenroadi Williams, 1986
Upogebia capensis (Krauss, 1843)
Upogebia careospina Williams, 1993
Upogebia cargadensis Borradaile, 1910
Upogebia carinicauda (Stimpson, 1860)
Upogebia casis Williams, 1993
Upogebia corallifora Williams & Scott, 1989
Upogebia cortesi Williams & Vargas, 2000
Upogebia crosnieri Le Loeuff & Intes, 1974
Upogebia darwinii (Miers, 1884)
Upogebia dawsoni Williams, 1986
Upogebia deltaura (Leach, 1815)
Upogebia demani de Saint Laurent & Le Loeuff, 1979
Upogebia digitina (Sakai, 1975)
Upogebia dromana Poore & Griffin, 1979
Upogebia felderi Williams, 1993
Upogebia fijiensis Sakai, 1982
Upogebia furcata (Aurivillius, 1898)
Upogebia galapagensis Williams, 1986
Upogebia hexaceras (Ortmann, 1894)
Upogebia hirtifrons (White, 1847)
Upogebia holthuisi Sakai, 1982
Upogebia imperfecta Sakai, 1982
Upogebia inomissa Williams, 1993
Upogebia intermedia (De Man, 1888)
Upogebia iriomotensis Sakai & Hirano, 2006
Upogebia issaeffi (Balss, 1913)
Upogebia jamaicensis Thistle, 1973
Upogebia jonesi Williams, 1986
Upogebia kempi Shenoy, 1967
Upogebia kuekenthali Sakai, 1982
Upogebia laemanu Ngoc-Ho, 1990
Upogebia lenzrichtersi Sakai, 1982
Upogebia lepta Williams, 1986
Upogebia lincolni Ngoc-Ho, 1977
Upogebia litoralis Petanga, 1792
Upogebia longicauda Sakai, 1975
Upogebia longipollex (Streets, 1871)
Upogebia maccraryae Williams, 1986
Upogebia macginitieorum Williams, 1986
Upogebia major (De Haan, 1841)
Upogebia marina Coêlho, 1973
Upogebia mediterranea Noël, 1992
Upogebia miyakei Sakai, 1967
Upogebia molipollex Williams, 1993
Upogebia mortenseni Sakai, 2006
Upogebia neglecta De Man, 1927
Upogebia nitida (A. Milne-Edwards, 1868)
Upogebia noronhensis Fausto-Filho, 1969
Upogebia octoceras (Nobili, 1904)
Upogebia omissa Gomes Corrêa, 1968
Upogebia omissago Williams, 1993
Upogebia onychion Williams, 1986
Upogebia osidiris Nobili, 1904
Upogebia ovalis Ngoc-Ho, 1991
Upogebia paraffinis Williams, 1993
Upogebia pillsburyi Williams, 1993
Upogebia poensis de Saint Laurent & Ngoc-Ho, 1979
Upogebia pseudochelata Tattersall, 1921
Upogebia pugettensis (Dana, 1852)
Upogebia pugnax De Man, 1905
Upogebia pusilla (Petagna, 1792)
Upogebia quddusiae Tirmizi & Ghani, 1978
Upogebia ramphula Williams, 1986
Upogebia rhadames Nobili, 1904
Upogebia rostrospinosa Bott, 1955
Upogebia saigusai Sakai & Hirano, 2006
Upogebia saintlaurentae Ngoc-Ho, 2008
Upogebia sakaii Ngoc-Ho, 1994
Upogebia savignyi (Strahl, 1862)
Upogebia schmitti Williams, 1986
Upogebia senegalensis Ngoc-Ho, 2001
Upogebia seychellensis Sakai, 1982
Upogebia shenchiajuii Yu, 1931
Upogebia snelliusi Ngoc-Ho, 1989
Upogebia spinidactylus Sakai & Hirano, 2006
Upogebia spinigera (Smith, 1871)
Upogebia spinimanus Ngoc-Ho, 1994
Upogebia spinistipula Williams & Heard, 1991
Upogebia spongium Sakai, 1975
Upogebia srilankaensis Sakai, 2006
Upogebia stellata (Montagu, 1808)
Upogebia stenorhynchus Ngoc-Ho, 1991
Upogebia tenuipollex Williams, 1986
Upogebia thistlei Williams, 1986
Upogebia tipica (Nardo, 1869)
Upogebia toralae Williams & Hernández-Aguilera, 1998
Upogebia tractabilis Hale, 1941
Upogebia vargasae Williams, 1997
Upogebia vasquezi Ngoc-Ho, 1989
Upogebia veleronis Williams, 1986
Upogebia wuhsienweni Yu, 1931
Upogebia yokoyai Makarov, 1938

References

Thalassinidea
Decapod genera